Maurizio Maffi (born 8 May 1956) is a former Italian long jumper.

Career
Two-time national champion at senior level in long jump in 1978 and 1980.

Achievements

References

1956 births
Living people
Italian male long jumpers